Broken Compass is the debut record from Sleepwave through Epitaph Records. This is also the first full release for lead singer Spencer Chamberlain since the breakup of his previous band Underoath, before they got back together.

Background
Chamberlain announced the formation of his new band in September 2013. The first track from the album was released on October of that year, "Rock And Roll Is Dead And So Am I". The album was produced by David Bendeth, whose credits include that of Bring Me the Horizon and Of Mice & Men. In an interview with Under the Gun Chamberlain said, "...I feel like when the record comes out things will change. Everyone that has supported us so far has been 100% in, they love what we’re up to. It’s something new, something fresh. It’s not me trying to relive my past or regurgitate something I’ve already done a million times."

Reception

The album has been met with generally positive reviews. Jason Pettigrew of Alternative Press wrote, "There’s a certain kind of chrome-plated nostalgia at play on Broken Compass, one that hearkens back to the glory days of Alternative Nation, where bands like Smashing Pumpkins, Foo Fighters, Nine Inch Nails and Filter held court and garnered mass acclaim, but not at the expense of extracting their personalities from their art." HittheFloor's Antoine Omisore had a more mixed review, "...‘Broken Compass,’ gets a little dreary whether it’s through the shackled efforts of a Deftones esque ambience on ‘Hold Up My Head’ or the murky ‘Disgusted : Disguised’. It’s almost as if they’ve taken track ‘Repeat Routine’ literally, with a large portion of songs sounding like an identikit of each other."

The album was included at number 43 on Rock Sounds "Top 50 Albums of the Year" list.

Track listing

Personnel

Sleepwave
 Spencer Chamberlain – vocals, Lyrics, guitars, keyboards, programming
 Stephen Bowman – guitars, bass guitar, keyboards, programming

Additional musicians
Chris Kamrada – Drums
Greg Johnson – programming

Production
Produced by David Bendeth, 2014 @ The House Of Loud, Elmwood Park, NJ
Mixed by David Bendeth & Brian Robbins
Mastered by Ted Jensen @ Sterling Sound, New York
Digital editing & engineers: Mitch Milan, Brian Robbins & Steve Sarkassian
Additional composer (tracks: 4, 5, 8-10): John Bendeth
Artwork by Aaron Marsh & Sam Kaufman
Design by Sam Kaufman

References
 Citations

Sources

 

2014 debut albums
Sleepwave albums
Epitaph Records albums
Albums produced by David Bendeth